Krnjača is a village located in the municipality of Priboj, southwestern Serbia. According to the 2011 census, the village has a population of 149 inhabitants.

Krnjača is located near the border between Serbia and Montenegrin, only 12 kilometers from the city of Pljevlja in Montenegro and 48 km from the town of Priboj. A local road which connects Plevlja to Priboj crosses the village. Before the Yugoslav wars, a mountain station was located on a hill in the part of the village known as Ravna Krnjača. On that point the altitude from sea-level is 1,220 meters.

By the 2002 census the village had 220 inhabitants, most of them declared as Serbs (219) and just one declared as Montenegrin. The population of the village is constantly declining.

References

Populated places in Zlatibor District